Baptist Seminary of Kentucky (BSK) is a Baptist theological institute located in Lexington, Kentucky. It is affiliated with the Cooperative Baptist Fellowship and the National Baptist Convention of America, Inc.

The Baptist Seminary of Kentucky has its origins in a 1996 project of the Kentucky Baptist Fellowship (Cooperative Baptist Fellowship). The school began in 2002 at Calvary Baptist Church in Lexington. In 2010, it moved in Georgetown College in Georgetown, Kentucky. In 2020, it became a partner of the National Baptist Convention of America, Inc.. In 2022, it moved to Central Baptist Church in Lexington, Kentucky.

Baptist Seminary of Kentucky (BSK) is accredited by the Commission on Accrediting of the Association of Theological Schools in the United States and Canada (ATS). The Master of Divinity degree program is approved by the Commission on Accrediting.

References

External links
 Baptist Seminary of Kentucky official website

References

Seminaries and theological colleges in Kentucky
Baptist seminaries and theological colleges in the United States
Baptist Christianity in Kentucky